These are four lists of achievements in major international gymnastics events according to first-place, second-place and third-place results obtained by gymnasts representing different nations. The objective is not to create combined medal tables; the focus is on listing the best positions achieved by gymnasts in major international competitions, ranking the nations according to the most number of podiums accomplished by gymnasts of these nations. All seven competitive disciplines currently recognized by the International Gymnastics Federation (FIG) are covered: 1) acrobatic gymnastics, 2) aerobic gymnastics, 3) men's artistic gymnastics, 4) women's artistic gymnastics, 5) women's rhythmic gymnastics, 6) trampoline and tumbling, and 7) parkour.

Results

From major senior events
For the making of the list, results from four major senior-level international competitions were consulted, as follows: 1) the Olympic Games; 2) the different editions of the World Gymnastics Championships, organized by FIG for each of the gymnastics disciplines; 3) the different stages of the FIG World Cup, as well as the events that preceded it – the IFSA World Cup and the FIT World Cup; and 4) the World Games, in which gymnastics disciplines that are not yet part of the Olympic Games are contested. According to the 2018 Technical Regulations established by the FIG, as well as the statutes of the organization, these are all considered official FIG competitions. FIG also considers the defunct Four Continents Championships as an official competition, but since the tournament excluded nations from Europe, results have not been included. The Olympic Games, the World Championships, the FIG World Cup and the World Games are the only senior international competitions currently listed on individual profiles at the official FIG database, what indicates their high level of importance. Competitions that are not official FIG events, such as the Rhythmic Gymnastics Grand Prix, or the gymnastics events at the Universiade and Goodwill Games, were not considered for the creation of this list.

The conventions used on this table are AC for Acrobatic Gymnastics, AE for Aerobic Gymnastics, MA for Men's Artistic Gymnastics, WA for Women's Artistic Gymnastics, PK for Parkour, RG for Rhythmic Gymnastics, TT for Trampoline and Tumbling.

The table is pre-sorted by total number of first-place results, second-place results and third-place results, respectively. When equal ranks are given, nations are listed in alphabetical order.

From major junior events

For the making of this list, results from major junior-level international competitions were consulted, as follows: 1) Youth Olympic Games, and 2) Junior World Gymnastics Championships in acrobatic gymnastics (formerly known as sports acrobatics), artistic gymnastics and rhythmic gymnastics. Before merging with the FIG in 1999, the International Federation of Sports Acrobatics (IFSA) organized and promoted World Junior Championships in acrobatic gymnastics from 1989 to 1999.

Currently, FIG organizes periodical World Age Group competitions in aerobic gymnastics, acrobatic gymnastics, and trampoline. The former governing body for the trampoline, the International Trampoline Federation (FIT), incorporated into the FIG in 1998, also organized World Age Groups competitions from 1973 to 1996. World Age Group competitions were not considered for the making of this list because these events are not officially titled World Championships. In 2019, Junior World Championships were staged for the first time in artistic gymnastics and rhythmic gymnastics.

The conventions used on this table are AC for Acrobatic Gymnastics, MA for Men's Artistic Gymnastics, WA for Women's Artistic Gymnastics, RG for Rhythmic Gymnastics, TT for Trampoline. Aerobic gymnastics and parkour have neither been competed at the Youth Olympics, nor Junior World Championships have been organized for these disciplines.

The table is pre-sorted by total number of first-place results, second-place results and third-place results, respectively. When equal ranks are given, nations are listed in alphabetical order.

Historical teams 

These are lists of results achieved by gymnasts from defunct nations, historical teams or teams composed of gymnasts representing different National Olympic Committees (NOCs).

The conventions used on the tables are AC for Acrobatic Gymnastics, AE for Aerobic Gymnastics, MA for Men's Artistic Gymnastics, WA for Women's Artistic Gymnastics, PK for Parkour, RG for Rhythmic Gymnastics, TT for Trampoline and Tumbling.

Senior

Junior

Further reading 
 Gymnastics at the Summer Olympics
 List of Olympic medalists in gymnastics (men)
 List of Olympic medalists in gymnastics (women)
 World Gymnastics Championships
 List of medalists at the World Rhythmic Gymnastics Championships
 FIG World Cup
 Artistic Gymnastics World Cup
 Rhythmic Gymnastics World Cup
 List of medalists at the FIG World Cup Final
 Gymnastics at the World Games
 Gymnastics at the Youth Olympic Games
 Junior World Gymnastics Championships

See also 

Major continental events
 Africa
 African Artistic Gymnastics Championships
 Americas
 Gymnastics at the Central American and Caribbean Games
 Gymnastics at the Pan American Games
 Gymnastics at the South American Games
 Pan American Gymnastics Championships
 South American Gymnastics Championships
 Asia
 Asian Gymnastics Championships
 Gymnastics at the Asian Games
 Europe
 European Gymnastics Championships
 Gymnastics at the European Games
 List of medalists at the UEG European Cup Final
 Northern European Gymnastics Championships

Major international events
 Four Continents Gymnastics Championships
 Gymnastics at the Commonwealth Games
 Gymnastics at the Mediterranean Games
 Gymnastics at the Summer Universiade
 Pacific Rim Championships
 Rhythmic Gymnastics Grand Prix Final
 List of medalists at the Rhythmic Gymnastics Grand Prix Final

Others
 List of major achievements in sports by nation

References 

Gymnastics
Gymnastics competitions
Gymnastics-related lists